In March 1971, various leftist groups in the Dominion of Ceylon (present-day Sri Lanka) protested against U.S. involvement in the Vietnam War.

Riots
The protesters gathered in the road leading to the U.S. embassy and many of them were youths who were influenced by the worldwide Anti-War Movement including the group within United States itself. The government didn't pay attention to the protests until 10 March 1971 when the protesters threw a petrol bomb towards the United States Embassy in Ceylon.

The rioters attacked and damaged the vehicles parked outside the embassy and killed a police officer who was at duty outside the embassy. This attacks were believed to be planned by the political movement, Janatha Vimukthi Peramuna which was a revolutionary communist youth front. Although it was new, the party was alleged to many crimes by other leftist groups at the time. JVP denied active involvement and claimed it was government sponsored anti-communism and that it is trying to stop a revolutionary movement. Following the allegations, JVP planned arming itself and be more elitist especially against the government. LSSP R and Revolutionary Youth Front (Ceylon) was also among the rally. JVP members claimed later that they were in fact involved but the group that threw a petrol bomb was a different group named JVP - Dharmasekara group and Wijeweera had no involvement. They further stated that Dharmasekara group was a Maoist group that tried to stop it from carrying out a revolution involving 'mass movement' rather than Maoist Potracted People's War tactics. Later in prison, Wijeweera wrote a book where he states "It is much easier to make a Guerrilla than coordinate a Political Movement".

Account of the JVP members
According to the JVP a politburo member, known as Dharmasekara was responsible. Osmond was the secondary leader of the JVP next to Wijeweera and he said he wasn't aware of the attack. Police raided his compound to arrest him and Wijeweera in prison have sent a message to Osmond who is also under arrest, according to 'Niyamuva' (a JVP publication) the message read:

Government reaction and arrests
The government banned the Janatha Vimukthi Peramuna. The ban was to be lift by 1972 but the group banned would go begin a uprising that made the government name it as a terrorist organization. CCP (Maoist) was also banned in 1971 following the uprising. JVP leader 
Rohana Wijeweera was arrested and was sent to the Jaffna prison. The other groups that were blamed was the Lanka Sama Samaja Party (Revolutionary), Socialist Students Union (a recruitment wing of the JVP) and Revolutionary Youth Front (Ceylon).

13 March 1971 
Wijeweera and Senanayake was arrested by Ceylon Police Force.

19 March 1971 
On 19 March 1971 it was announced that Police and Army were given broad powers. At the time the number taken into custody was around 100.

20 March 1971 
The Department of Information reported on 20 March 1971 that the number taken into custody was around 120. The security forces set fire to a house for the first time at Mawarala in Matara to capture some JVP members.

27 March 1971 
The government captures more than 300 youths. Many who worked with Nagalingam Shanmugadasan at the CCP was also arrested. Vidyodaya and Vidyalankara campuses were raided by the Armed forces due to the alleged connections to the JVP and CCP (Maoist).

By 1 April, over 410 were  arrested.

5 April 1971 
The JVP launches a pre-planned island wide insurrection to take cover the government through an armed revaluation.

See also
1971 JVP insurrection
1953 Ceylonese Hartal
Anti-American sentiment
Decolonization of Asia
Quit India movement
Naxalbari uprising

References

1970 protests
Riots and civil disorder in Sri Lanka 
Anti-war protests 
1971 JVP insurrection 
1970 by country 
1971 by country 
1971 protests 
Opposition to United States involvement in the Vietnam War 
Protests against the Vietnam War